George Frank Vincent Sharples (20 September 1943 – 14 December 2020) was an English footballer who played in the Football League as a wing half for Everton, Blackburn Rovers and Southport. He was a schoolboy international and represented England at youth level.

Sharples died on 14 December 2020, aged 77.

References

1943 births
2020 deaths
People from Ellesmere Port
Association football wing halves
English footballers
England schools international footballers
England youth international footballers
Everton F.C. players
Blackburn Rovers F.C. players
Southport F.C. players
English Football League players